The muscular branches of ulnar nerve are a variety of branches of the ulnar nerve. One supplies the flexor carpi ulnaris muscle (a superficial muscle of the anterior compartment of the forearm), while the other supplies the ulnar half of the flexor digitorum profundus muscle (a deep muscle of the anterior compartment of the forearm).

Structure 
The muscular branches of the ulnar nerve arise at the elbow. Multiple branches may supply each muscle.

Variation 
The branching pattern of the muscular branches of the ulnar nerve varies significantly.

Function 
The muscular branches of the ulnar nerve supply two flexor muscles of the anterior compartment of the forearm:

 flexor carpi ulnaris muscle, a superficial muscle.
 the ulnar / medial half of the flexor digitorum profundus muscle, a deep muscle.

References 

Nerves of the upper limb